Saber Abdel Aziz al-Douri is a former Iraqi politician, intelligence officer and Governor of Bagdad.

Background
Aziz comes from Ad-Dawr, and is a member of the Albu Haidar tribe in Saladin Governorate.

Career

Military career
Aziz graduated from the Iraqi Military Academy in March 1967, and then later went on to graduate from the Staff College.

During his career in the military he held numerous positions;
Commander of the 14th tank battalion.
Commander of the 10th Armoured Brigade.
Commander of the 17th Armored Division.
Director of military strategy in the Iraqi Ministry of Defense.
Prmoted to membership of the General Command of the Armed Forces in July 1985.
Was appointed Director of General Military Intelligence in April 1986.
Promoted to the rank of Lieutenant General in 1989.

He was later appointed to several political posts. Between 1996 and 2001 he served as Governor of Karbala Province, and following this he served as Governor of Baghdad Province from 2001 to 2003.

Iraqi Special Tribunal
Aziz was charged by the Iraqi Special Tribunal with war crimes relating to his role as the Director of Military Intelligence during the al-Anfal Campaign. Aziz was found guilty and given a life sentence.

References

Arab Socialist Ba'ath Party – Iraq Region politicians
Governors of Baghdad Governorate
Governors of Karbala Governorate
Iraqi generals
Iraqi soldiers
Living people
Iraqi mass murderers
1949 births